Jimmy Ma (born October 11, 1995) is an American figure skater. He is the 2021 CS Golden Spin of Zagreb bronze medalist, the 2018 CS U.S. International Figure Skating Classic bronze medalist, the Philadelphia Summer International silver medalist, and the 2021 Cranberry International silver medalist. Ma has competed in nine senior U.S. national championships, achieving his highest result, 5th, in 2023.

Skating career

Early career 
Ma began learning to skate in 2004. He grew up in Great Neck where he skated at Parkwood Sports Complex and Chelsea Piers. He made his ISU Junior Grand Prix debut in August 2013, placing 13th in Riga, Latvia. Elaine Zayak, Steven Rice and Hongyun Liu coached him in Hackensack, New Jersey.

2017–2018 season 
Ma placed eleventh at the 2018 U.S. Championships.

2018–2020 season 
As of the 2018–2019 season, Ma is coached by Darlene Cain and Peter Cain in Euless, Texas and by Nikolai Morozov in Hackensack, New Jersey. He began his season with silver at the Philadelphia Summer International and then took bronze at the 2018 CS U.S. International Figure Skating Classic. He made his Grand Prix debut at the 2018 Skate America.

2019–2020 season 
Ma won the gold medal at the 2020 Eastern Sectionals, earning him a spot at the 2020 U.S. Championships, where he placed thirteenth.  He competed internationally at two Challenger events, placing sixth at the U.S. Classic and fourth at Finlandia Trophy.

2020–2021 season 
Due to the coronavirus pandemic limiting travel, Ma was assigned to compete on the Grand Prix at the 2020 Skate America.  He placed tenth at the event.

Ma placed sixth at the 2021 U.S. Championships, the best result of his senior career.

2021–2022 season 
Ma started his season with a silver medal at the Cranberry Cup. A couple of weeks later, he won another silver medal at the U.S. Classic. He was named to the team for the 2021 Asian Open Trophy, but the entire American team was later withdrawn. He was later named to the team for the 2021 Skate America as a replacement for Yaroslav Paniot. He placed fifth overall at the event, including an unexpected third place in the short program. Ma was subsequently assigned to two additional Challenger events, coming sixteenth at the 2021 CS Warsaw Cup before winning a bronze medal at the 2021 CS Golden Spin of Zagreb.

Hoping to qualify for the American Olympic team, Ma competed at the 2022 U.S. Championships but finished in sixth place. He was instead sent to the 2022 Four Continents Championships in Tallinn, where he finished tenth.

2022–2023 season 
At the 2022 CS U.S. Classic, Ma initially placed eighth in the short program. He rebounded in the free skate, finishing third in that segment and rising to fifth place overall. On the Grand Prix at the 2022 Skate Canada International, Ma finished ninth. He came seventh at the 2022 MK John Wilson Trophy.

Ma finished fifth at the 2023 U.S. Championships. This in turn earned him an assignment to the 2023 Four Continents Championships. Despite a slight underrotation on his triple Axel in the short program at Four Continents, Ma placed third in the segment, winning a bronze small medal. He said that he was "really glad that I was able to retire this program on a good note." The free skate proved more difficult, and he dropped to ninth.

Programs

Competitive highlights
GP: Grand Prix; CS: Challenger Series; JGP: Junior Grand Prix

2012–2013 to present

2007–2008 to 2011–2012

References

External links 
 
 Jimmy Ma at U.S. Figure Skating

1995 births
American male single skaters
Living people
Sportspeople from Plano, Texas
Sportspeople from Queens, New York